

Infantry
1st Oregon Volunteer Infantry Regiment

Cavalry
1st Oregon Volunteer Cavalry Regiment

Artillery
 No artillery regiments were raised in the State of Oregon during the American Civil War.

State Militia
Mountain Rangers
Washington Guards
Fenian Guards
Zouave Cadets
Marion Rifles

See also
 Lists of American Civil War Regiments by State
 Lists of Oregon-related topics

References
 Phisterer, Frederick (1883). Statistical Record of the Armies of the United States. New York: C.Scribner's Sons.  Pg 19.

External links
1st Oregon Volunteer Infantry Reenacting Group
Col. Edward D. Baker Camp - Sons of Union Veterans of the Civil War

 
Oregon
Civil War